The Czech Republic has offered registered partnerships for same-sex couples since 1 July 2006. Registered partnerships grant several of the rights of marriage, including inheritance, the right to declare a same-sex partner as next of kin, hospital visitation rights, jail and prison visitation rights, spousal privilege, and alimony rights, but do not allow joint adoption, widow's pension, or joint property rights. The registered partnership law was passed in March 2006 and went into effect on 1 July 2006. The country also grants unregistered cohabitation status to "persons living in a common household" that gives couples inheritance and succession rights in housing.

A same-sex marriage bill is currently pending in the Parliament of the Czech Republic. Opinion polls show that the bill enjoys majority support among the Czech people.

Registered partnerships
There had been several attempts to allow same-sex registered partnerships in the Czech Republic. In 1998, a partnership bill reached the Chamber of Deputies, but was defeated by two votes. In 1999, the chamber voted against another bill. In February 2001, the Zeman Cabinet presented a third bill, which was rejected by Parliament in October 2001. On 11 February 2005, another bill was defeated by one vote. It was backed by 82 out of the 165 deputies present, most voting in favour being Social Democrats, Communists, Freedom Union members and some deputies from the opposition Civic Democratic Party (ODS).

In April 2005, a partnership bill passed its first reading in the chamber with 82 votes for and 9 against. On 16 December 2005, it passed its third reading with 86 votes for, 54 against, and 7 abstentions. The legislation established registered partnerships for same-sex couples, providing several of the rights of marriage, including inheritance, the right to declare a same-sex partner as next of kin, hospital visitation rights, jail and prison visitation rights, spousal privilege and alimony rights, but not allowing joint adoption rights, widow's pension, or joint property rights.

The legislation was passed by the Senate on 26 January 2006 in a 65–14 vote.

On 16 February 2006, President Václav Klaus vetoed the bill. In response, Prime Minister Jiří Paroubek said that he would seek a parliamentary majority (101 votes) in the lower chamber to override the veto and did so successfully on 15 March 2006 with the exact number of votes needed (101) out of 177 votes cast.

In September 2014, a group of deputies introduced a bill to permit a person to adopt the stepchild(ren) of their registered partner (i.e. stepchild adoption). In October 2014, the Sobotka Cabinet decided not to take an official stance on the bill. Instead, on 24 October 2016, it approved its own draft bill on the issue, and introduced it to Parliament on 8 November. The bills were not brought to a vote before the 2017 legislative election.

There are a number of differences between registered partnerships and marriage. Registered partners do not have the same rights to shared property as married couples, do not receive the same tax benefits, and do not have the right to a widow or widower's pension or adoption rights. Another major distinction is that registered partnerships can only be performed in the 14 regional capitals, whereas marriages can be performed in over 1,200 registry offices throughout the country. This was noted in a July 2016 report by the ombudsman office, which also stated that a dying person in a hospital cannot enter into a partnership because of these restrictions.

Statistics
By June 2009, 780 registered partnerships had been conducted in the Czech Republic. By the end of 2010, that number had increased to 1,110, 66 of which had been dissolved. A large majority of these partnerships involved two Czech citizens, though there were also several couples with at least one partner from the United States, Slovakia or the United Kingdom.

Most partnerships are performed in Prague followed by Central Bohemia and South Moravia. The regions with the fewest partnerships are Zlín and Vysočina.

From July 2006 to the end of 2019, 3,625 registered partnerships were performed in the country. During this period, 913 partnerships (25%) were dissolved, lower than the divorce rate between opposite-sex partners of about 50%. In 2018, 318 couples entered into registered partnerships, and for the first time the number of lesbian couples surpassed that of male couples.

Same-sex marriage

The Green Party and the Pirate Party expressed support for same-sex marriage in their 2017 electoral programs. Following the adoption of a same-sex marriage law by the German Bundestag in June 2017, Zbyněk Stanjura, a deputy from the Civic Democratic Party (ODS), suggested that his party could agree to a free vote in Parliament.

Before the October 2017 election, activists started a campaign called "We Are Fair" to legalise same-sex marriage in the Czech Republic. The campaign found that a majority of deputies from ANO 2011, the Pirate Party, the Social Democratic Party (ČSSD), TOP 09, and the Mayors and Independents (STAN) supported same-sex marriage, while a minority of ODS, Communist and Christian Democratic MPs supported same-sex marriage, and no deputy from the Freedom and Direct Democracy (SPD) party was in favour. Prime Minister Andrej Babiš expressed support for the legalisation of same-sex marriage. 

On 12 June 2018, a bill to legalise same-sex marriage, sponsored by 46 deputies, was introduced to the Chamber of Deputies. Three days later, a group of 37 deputies proposed a constitutional amendment to define marriage as the "union of a man and a woman" in the Constitution of the Czech Republic, which would have required a two-thirds majority in the chamber. On 22 June 2018, the Babiš Cabinet announced its support for the same-sex marriage bill. The "We Are Fair" campaign presented 70,350 signatures in support of same-sex marriage to the Chamber of Deputies in late June. The first reading of the same-sex marriage bill was scheduled for 31 October, but was delayed to 14 November. As debate on both bills began, individual MPs spoke on both sides of the issue rather than split on party lines, indicative of a conscience vote. A vote was expected in January 2019, but was postponed to 26 March 2019, but then postponed again. On 10 January 2019, President Miloš Zeman stated that he might veto the same-sex marriage bill if it was passed by Parliament. Such a veto would force a second vote on the law, with the support of 101 deputies (50% + 1) required to override the presidential veto. On 29 April 2021, a proposal to reject the bill at first reading failed, receiving 41 votes from the 93 deputies present, and the bill therefore progressed to the committee stage. However, it did not advance further before the October 2021 election.

In June 2022, a cross-party same-sex marriage bill was introduced to the Chamber of Deputies. The bill would grant same-sex couples the same legal rights and benefits as opposite-sex married spouses, including joint property rights, adoption rights, the right to inherit their partner's pension and access to alternative family care. Several candidates in the 2023 presidential election supported same-sex marriage and adoption rights, including the winner, Petr Pavel, and runner-up Andrej Babiš.

Public opinion
A 2007 opinion poll from CVVM (Centrum pro výzkum veřejného mínění, Center for Public Opinion Research) indicated that 36% of Czechs supported the legalisation of same-sex marriage, while 57% were opposed. A May 2017 opinion poll by CVVM found a 52% majority in favour of legalising same-sex marriage, with 41% opposed.

A 2017 poll conducted by the Pew Research Center showed that 65% of Czechs supported same-sex marriage. Support was far higher among 18–34-year-olds, with only 18% of people in that age group being opposed to same-sex marriage. A Median poll conducted in February 2018 (and published in April) found that 75% of Czechs supported the right of gay and lesbian couples to marry, while 19% were opposed. 13% believed that legalising same-sex marriage would threaten opposite-sex marriages, and 8% believed it would threaten them personally. Additionally, 61% of Czechs were in support of adoption by same-sex couples, while 31% were opposed.

A poll from January 2019, when a same-sex marriage bill was scheduled to undergo first reading in Parliament, indicated that 61% of Czechs supported same-sex marriage. Various Czech celebrities also expressed support, including tennis player Martina Navratilova, singers Bára Basiková and Dara Rolins, photographer Robert Vano, actresses Simona Stašová and Anna Geislerová, and politician Ivan Bartoš. According to a June 2019 survey conducted in May 2019 by CVVM, 75% of respondents supported registered partnerships with 20% opposed, 47% supported same-sex marriage with 48% opposed, and 60% supported stepchild adoption with 31% opposed.

A Median poll published in January 2020 showed that 67% of Czechs supported same-sex marriage, and 62% supported joint adoption by same-sex couples. The survey found a large generational gap, with younger respondents overwhelmingly in support, but those aged 55 and above mostly opposed.

See also
 LGBT rights in the Czech Republic
 Recognition of same-sex unions in Europe

References

External links
 

LGBT rights in the Czech Republic
Czech Republic